The Lakes is an outer northeastern locality of Perth, the capital city of Western Australia, located within the Shire of Mundaring.

The main features of the community include a roadhouse and service station at the junction between the highways.  It borders on the western ward of the Shire of Northam and the community of Woottating.

It is also the locality in which Buckeridge Group of Companies (BGC) have quarrying operations.  BGC trucks carting material from the quarry use as their main route the Great Eastern Highway to various locations in the Perth metropolitan area, including the brick manufacturing location close to Perth Airport.

From the junction it is possible to travel to Northam on the northern fork, or York on the southern fork.

Notes

References

External links
 The Lakes on Geoscience Australia

Towns in Western Australia
Suburbs and localities in the Shire of Mundaring